, also kasu-zuke, is a Japanese dish made by pickling fish or vegetables in the lees (residual yeast and other precipitates) of sake, known as sake kasu.

History and variations 
Kasuzuke was made in the Kansai region as early as the Nara period, twelve hundred years ago.  Vegetable kasuzuke, known as shiru-kasu-zuke or Narazuke was originally made with white melon, but later with cucumbers, eggplants, uri, and pickling melons.  It was made by Buddhist monks, and used by samurai as imperishable wartime food.  During the Edo period of the 17th century, a sake dealer promoted it widely.  The dish spread throughout Japan and remains popular today.  Carrots, watermelon rind, and ginger may also be pickled in this way.

To make shiru-kasu-zuke vegetables are pickled in a mixture of sake-kasu (in paste or sheet form), mirin, sugar, and salt.  Optionally, ginger and citrus may be added.  Pickling time ranges from one to three years, with the younger pickles consumed locally in the summer and the older pickles, having turned an amber color, distributed as Narazuke.  To make fish kasuzuke, sugar is sometimes omitted, and sake, soy sauce, pepper and/or ginger may be added.  Typical fish include cod, salmon, butterfish, and tai snapper.  Brining time is one to several days.

Vegetable kasuzuke is eaten as pickles, and is sweet and mild.  Fish kasuzuke may be eaten raw or grilled over rice.  The flavor is mild but pungent.

References

External links
Honolulu Star Bulletin article 

Japanese cuisine
Japanese pickles